The Health Valley covers the Western Switzerland region, where the life sciences sector extends from Geneva to Bern, including the seven cantons of Bern, Fribourg, Geneva, Jura, Neuchâtel, Valais and Vaud. This cluster presents a critical mass of 1,000 companies, research centers and innovation support structures, representing today more than 25,000 employees. The Health Valley strives to animate the life sciences ecosystem of the region, by establishing thriving bridges between its ambassadors.

The name of the Health Valley is inspired by that of Silicon Valley in California, United States (where the focus is on information technology). According to Swiss newspaper Le Temps, there were close to 1,000 biotech and medtech companies in the Health Valley in 2017, employing 25,000 people.

The Health Valley network is led by BioAlps, an association funded by the 7 cantons of Western Switzerland and 12 academic members such as EPFL, UNIL, UNINE, UNIGE, HES-SO, HEIG-VD, HEPIA, UNIFR, CHUV, HUG, CSEM, SIB. Its mission is to represent the whole ecosystem and to foster synergies between all the actors. 

A digital interactive map, project led in 2016 by the Fondation Inartis, of the regional actors is located at healthvalley.ch.

According to Swiss journalist, the idea of a Health Valley was actively supported by Patrick Aebischer during his tenure as president of the Swiss Federal Institute of Technology in Lausanne/EPFL (2000-2016). Notably, Aebischer promoted teaching and research in the life sciences while deepening cooperation with Lausanne University Hospital/CHUV. 

Biotech expert Jürg Zürcher argues that Switzerland as a whole constitutes a cluster, with the Basel BioValley employing 50,000 people and the Zurich region employing 21,000. "Together, these three regions form the densest network of biotech firms anywhere in the world", Swiss Info notes, with over 40% of the world's pharmaceutical companies in the Basel region alone. Foreign competing clusters include the Oxford-Cambridge-London cluster in the United Kingdom, the Boston, San Francisco and San Diego clusters in the United States, as well as emerging ones in India (Hyderabad, Bangalore, New Delhi) and China (Shanghai, Shenzhen).

See also 
General : Science and technology in Switzerland, Pharmaceutical industry in Switzerland
Places : Swiss Innovation Park, Campus Biotech, UniverCité, Espace Création
Academic institutions : École Polytechnique Fédérale de Lausanne, University of Geneva, SICHH, Swiss Institute of Bioinformatics, Université de Lausanne, Wyss Center for bio and neuro-engineering
Companies : Abionic - AC Immune - ALRO Engineering SA - Altran - Anecova - Bachem - Bracco - Celgene - Covance - CSL Behring - Debiopharm - Eli Lilly - EspeRare - Ferring Pharmaceuticals - Glenmark Pharmaceuticals - IBM - IE Life Science Engineering - Incyte – Iqone Healthcare - Lonza - MayBa.ch - - Merck - NV Logistics - Regen Lab - Socar Research - Socorex - Sophia Genetics - Sunstar - Symbios - Symetis - TRB Chemedica - UCB - Valsynthèse 
Support: A3P Suisse - Banque Cantonale du Valais - BioAlps - Biopôle - Campus Biotech - Espace Création - Etat de Neuchâtel - EY - Gevers - GGBa - Inartis Network - Innovaud - Katzarov - Kessler - Lausanne Region - MedC. Partners - Medical Cluster - Promotion économique du Canton de Berne - Salon EPHJ-EPMT-SMT - SICHH - The Ark - UniverCité - Voisin Life Sciences Consulting 
Hospitals : CHUV - Clinique de la Source - Clinique Romande de réadaptation - HUG - Institut de recherche en réadaptation-réinsertion 
People : Prof. Benoît Dubuis, Ernesto Bertarelli, Hansjörg Wyss

Notes and references

External links 
BioAlps - Life Sciences Cluster
Inartis Foundation
Republic of Innovation - Health Valley database
Swiss Life Sciences Database
InVivo magazine

Subdivisions of Switzerland
Romandy
Pharmaceutical companies of Switzerland
Biomedical districts
Science and technology in Switzerland